August Greene is an American supergroup. The brainchild of rapper Common, and producers Robert Glasper and Karriem Riggins, it was formed in 2018 after sharing the Primetime Emmy Award for Outstanding Original Music and Lyrics for their song "Letter to the Free", which was part of Ava DuVernay's Netflix documentary 13th (2016).

The trio made their live debut on January 26, 2018 at New York's Highline Ballroom as part of Glasper's sixth annual Grammy Awards party, and released an eponymous joint album on March 9 through Amazon Music. The album was preceded by the single "Optimistic", a Sounds of Blackness cover featuring singer Brandy.

On February 21, 2018, August Greene performed an NPR Tiny Desk Concert.

Discography

Albums
August Greene (2018)

Singles

See also
List of musical supergroups

References

Musical groups established in 2018
American contemporary R&B musical groups
Supergroups (music)
2018 establishments in the United States